Death grip is an extremely tight grip, such as that exerted by a person in a panic for fear 

Death Grip may also refer to:

 "Death-grip syndrome", sexual dysfunction caused by aggressive masturbation
 Death Grip (film), a 2012 film
 Death Grips, an experimental hip hop band from Sacramento, California
Death Grips (EP), the eponymous EP by the group
 Deathgrip (album), a 2016 metalcore album by Fit for a King

See also 
 Vulcan death grip, a fictional technique featured in the Star Trek franchise